Ke is a Chinese surname. It originally appeared on the Hundred Family Surnames. As of 2006 was no longer one of the top 100 most common surnames. A 2013 study found that it was the 145th most common surname, shared by 1.06 million people or 0.080% of the population, with the province most being Hubei. It is also spelled as Quah, Qua, Kua, Kuah, Kwa, Ke, Ker, Ko, Kok, Or or O in English.

It is O in Cantonese.

Origin
There are several origins of this last name:
the descendants of Duke Ke Lu (柯盧) of the State of Wu during the Spring and Autumn period;
the descendants of a tribe in Northern Wei Dynasty whose surname was originally Keba (柯拔) but was simplified to Ke;
the descendants of the Qiang tribe or the Xianbei tribe with the last name Ke.

One website lists it as originating from the town of Han in Zhejiang Province while another states it originated in Jiyang Prefecture (located in present-day Dingtao County, Shandong Province) during the Jin Dynasty (266–420).

Prominent people with the family name 柯
 Cua Yi Lam, baptized as Domingo Lamco, patrilineal ancestor of Jose Rizal, Philippine national hero
 Ke Mengde, a Song Dynasty poet
 Ke Jiusi (柯九思), a Yuan Dynasty officer
 Ke Qian, a Ming Dynasty scholar
 Ke Weizhen, a Qing Dynasty poet
 Blackie Ko Shou Liang (柯受良), modern director, actor, stuntman
 Alan Ke You Lun (柯有綸) a Taiwanese singer and actor; son of Blackie Ko Shou Liang
 Ker Chien-ming (柯建銘), Taiwanese politician 
 Danny Quah Professor of economics, London School of Economics
 Kwa Geok Choo, the wife of Singapore's first prime minister, Lee Kuan Yew
 Ko Chen-tung (柯震東), a Taiwanese actor and singer
 Ko Chia-yen (柯佳嬿), a Taiwanese actress
 Ko Wen-je (柯文哲), mayor of Taipei
 Ke Jie (柯洁), a Chinese World Go Champion
 Quah Chow Cheung (柯昭璋), a Hong Kongese commissioner
 Simon Ko, Deputy Foreign Minister of the Republic of China
 Quah Kim Lye, a Singaporean footballer
 Quah Kim Song (柯金松), a Singaporean footballer
 Quah Ting Wen (柯婷文), a Singaporean swimmer
 Quah Zheng Wen (柯政文), a Singaporean swimmer
 Quah Jing Wen (柯敬文), a Singaporean swimmer
 Ke Qingshi (柯庆施), senior Chinese politician

Prominent people with the family name Kha
Kha is a Vietnamese variant of the family name Ke (柯)
Kha Mỹ Vân, a Vietnamese model

See also
Hundred Family Surnames
Chinese name

References

External links
Origin of surname Ke, Ker and Quah
Google group post on Chinese surname Ke number 164

Chinese-language surnames
Individual Chinese surnames